Fabrizio De Angelis is an Italian director, screenwriter and producer.

Life and career 
Fabrizio De Angelis was born in Rome, Italy on November 15, 1940. De Angelis would produced a number of genre films for other directors such as those of Joe D'Amato's Emanuelle series, Lucio Fulci's horror films and Enzo G. Castellari's action films. His production companies were Fulvia Film, Fulvia CInematografica, and Deaf International Films. He often worked under the name Larry Ludman.

Selected filmography

Notes

References

External links 
 

20th-century Italian people
Italian film directors
Italian screenwriters
Living people
Italian film producers
Horror film directors
Italian male screenwriters
Year of birth missing (living people)